The 2012 Season of the Supertaça Compal, (3rd edition), took place in Benguela and Luanda, Angola from February 14 to 19, 2012 and was contested by six teams from Angola, Portugal and Mozambique split into two groups, each group playing in a round robin system, the first of each group playing for the title, the second for third place and the third for fifth place. Petro Atlético from Angola was the winner.

Draw

2012 Supertaça Compal squads

Group stage

Group A

Group B

Classification matches

5th place match

3rd place match

Final

Final standings

See also
COMPAL
Federação Angolana de Basquetebol
Federação Portuguesa de Basquetebol

References

External links
Interbasket Forum Page

2012
2012
2011–12 in Angolan basketball
2011–12 in Portuguese basketball
Bask